Kenneth R. Clark (June 17, 1966 – February 16, 2013) was a professional American football player from Evergreen, Alabama who played running back for three seasons for the Indianapolis Colts.

College
Clark was a two-time All Big-Eight running back for the Nebraska Cornhuskers from 1986-89. Following a redshirt season in 1986, Clark played sporadically as a sophomore, appearing in eight games before suffering a knee strain. He rushed for over 1,000 yards in both his junior and senior seasons, and as of 2012, his three-year rushing total of 3,037 yards ranks seventh on Nebraska's all-time leaders in that category. He averaged 6.1 yards per carry for his college career. His career highlight came during his junior season in a 1988 game against Oklahoma State where he outgained eventual Heisman trophy winner Barry Sanders 256 yards to 189 and also scored three touchdowns, the first on a dazzling 73 yard run on Nebraska's first play from scrimmage.

NFL
In 1990, Clark was drafted in the eighth round by the Indianapolis Colts and appeared in 34 games for the Colts in three seasons. In 1991, he was the only running back to play in all 16 games for the Colts.

Death
Clark died on Saturday, February 16, 2013 in Minneapolis, following a massive heart attack. His cousin, Stephanie Clark of Omaha, confirmed Clark's death.

References

External links
NFL.com player page

1966 births
2013 deaths
People from Bellevue, Nebraska
People from Sarpy County, Nebraska
People from Evergreen, Alabama
Players of American football from Alabama
American football running backs
Nebraska Cornhuskers football players
Indianapolis Colts players